Maine Question 2 may refer to:

2016 Maine Question 2, An Act to Establish The Fund to Advance Public Kindergarten to Grade 12 Education
2017 Maine Question 2, An Act To Enhance Access to Affordable Health Care